Tamborita may refer to:

Tamborita (Bolivia), a type of folk band from Bolivia
Tamborita calentana, a folk drum from Mexico